Saiful Islam Hiru is a Bangladeshi politician from the Bangladesh Nationalist Party and a former Member of Parliament.

CareerRokibul 
Saiful Islam Hiru was elected to Parliament from Comilla-10 in 1988 representing Laksham. He is the president of Laksham Upazila unit of Bangladesh Nationalist Party.

Disappearance
On 27 November 2013, Saiful Islam Hiru and fellow BNP politician Humayun Kabir Parvez were travelling from Laksham to Comilla on an ambulance when they disappeared. Tareque Sayeed, commanding officer of Rapid Action Battalion-11 was mentioned in the case filed by Hiru's relatives. Tareque would be arrested and sentenced to death in the Narayanganj Seven Murder case.

References

Bangladesh Nationalist Party politicians
Living people
4th Jatiya Sangsad members
Enforced disappearances in Bangladesh
Year of birth missing (living people)
Missing person cases in Bangladesh